Mir Izhar Hussain Khosa is a Pakistani politician who was a Member of the Provincial Assembly of Balochistan, from May 2013 to May 2018.

Personal life and education
He is a graduate and an agriculturist by profession.

Political career
He ran for the seat of the Provincial Assembly of Balochistan as a candidate of Pakistan Muslim League (Q) from Constituency PB-28 Nasirabad-I in 2008 Pakistani general election but was unsuccessful. He received 9,985 votes and lost the seat to a candidate of Pakistan Peoples Party (PPP).

He was elected to the Provincial Assembly of Balochistan as a candidate of Pakistan Muslim League (N) from Constituency PB-27 Jaffarabad-III in 2013 Pakistani general election. He received 9,681 votes and defeated a candidate of PPP.

In February 2016, he was arrested by the National Accountability Bureau over corruption charges.

References

Living people
Balochistan MPAs 2013–2018
Pakistan Muslim League (N) politicians
Year of birth missing (living people)